Anthony Johnston may refer to:
Antony Johnston (born 1972), British writer
Anthony Johnston (footballer), Scottish footballer
Tony Johnston, Australian television presenter, producer and radio broadcaster

See also
Tony Johnstone (born 1956), Zimbabwean golfer
Anthony Johnson (disambiguation)